Air India Football Club is an Indian professional association football club based in Mumbai. The club was formed in Mumbai in 1952 by Air India.

Air India have never won the League championship, nor the Federation Cup. They were though the winners of the 1999-2000 National Football League Second Division.

History
Air India FC has been playing in the Premier Harwood League since 1980. The team though qualified for the National Football League in 1995. In 1996 the club finished 6th in the League and then 5th in 1997.

After being relegated to the second division in 1998, Air India paved their way back into the first division the next year and played in the National Football League in 2000 as well. The years 2001 to 2004 saw Air India going through a tough phase as they were playing in the second division. In 2005 the team qualified to the National Football League first division and then 2007 saw Air India finishing 7th and were the Mumbai Harwood Champions in 2005.

Key

 P = Played
 W = Games won
 D = Games drawn
 L = Games lost
 F = Goals for
 A = Goals against
 Pts = Points
 Pos = Final position

 Div 1 = National Football League
 Div 2 = National Football League Second Division
 IL = I-League

 F = Final
 Group = Group stage
 R16 = Round of 16
 QF = Quarter-finals

 R1 = Round 1
 R2 = Round 2
 R3 = Round 3
 R4 = Round 4
 R5 = Round 5
 R6 = Round 6
 SF = Semi-finals

Seasons

References

Air India
Seasons
Air India